The Dimitrovsky Bridge or The Dimitrov Bridge (Dimitrovsky Most) is an automobile bridge over the Ob River, connecting the Zheleznodorozhny and Leninsky districts of Novosibirsk, Russia.

History
The Bridge was built by Sibmost Company. It was opened on November 4, 1978. The cost of construction amounted to 20 million rubles.

External links
 Тридцать лет назад открылся Димитровский мост. НГС.
 Оловозаводской мост: надежда и опора. НГС.
 Взлётная полоса. НГС.

Bridges over the Ob River
D
Zheleznodorozhny City District, Novosibirsk
Leninsky District, Novosibirsk
Bridges completed in 1978